Chamrieng Et Preang Tuk is a 1974 Cambodian musical film directed and produced by Sinn Sisamouth. The film star Kong Som Eun and Vichara Dany. It also features singer Ros Serey Sothea.

Soundtrack

References 
 

1974 films
Khmer-language films
Cambodian drama films
1970s musical films